The Manfred Mann Album is the debut American studio album by Manfred Mann, released in September 1964 on Ascot Records. It contains the hit single "Do Wah Diddy Diddy", as well as covers of well-known R&B hits such as "Smokestack Lightning" by Howlin' Wolf, "I'm Your Hoochie Coochie Man" by Muddy Waters, and "Down the Road Apiece" by Will Bradley. Modern reviews of the album are generally positive and consider The Manfred Mann Album an important piece during the heydey of the British Invasion.

Background
The twelve tracks on the record include the group's hit single "Do Wah Diddy Diddy", which reached No. 1 on the Billboard Hot 100 chart, while the rest reflect on their love of R&B, including cover versions of Howlin' Wolf's "Smokestack Lightning", Muddy Waters' "Got My Mojo Working", and Bo Diddley's "Bring It to Jerome". The album includes the Cannonball Adderley song "Sack O' Woe".

Eleven of the twelve tracks were taken from Manfred Mann's debut British release, The Five Faces of Manfred Mann.

Reception

In his retrospective review of the release, Richie Unterberger for AllMusic wrote “Manfred Mann's debut full-length U.S. platter was probably their strongest, and indeed one of the stronger British Invasion albums of the very competitive year of 1964. Besides the smash "Do Wah Diddy Diddy," it contained a number of fine soul and R&B covers. Standouts were the versions of "Untie Me" and Ike & Tina Turner's "It's Gonna Work Out Fine," as well as the strong pounding Paul Jones original, "Without You."

Track listing
All credits adapted from the original releases.

Recording sessions
All of the songs were recorded 17 December 1963 – 22 June 1964 at EMI Studios, London, England:

17 December: "Without You"
5 February: "I'm Your Hoochie Coochie Man", "Down the Road Apiece", "Sack O' Woe"
6 March: "Got My Mojo Working", "Smokestack Lightning"
10 April: "Bring It to Jerome", "Untie Me"
5 May: "Untie Me", "Don't Ask Me What I Say", "It's Gonna Work Out Fine"
5 June: "What You Gonna Do?"
11 & 22 June: "Do Wah Diddy Diddy"

Personnel
Manfred Mann
 Manfred Mann – keyboards, backing vocals
 Paul Jones – lead vocals, harmonica
 Mike Vickers – guitars, saxes, flutes, backing vocals
 Tom McGuinness – bass, backing vocals
 Mike Hugg – drums, percussion, vibes
 Dave Richmond – bass on "Without You"

Production
 John Burgess – producer, mixing
 Norman Smith – engineer

Release history

References

External links

See also
 Manfred Mann discography

1964 albums
Manfred Mann albums